Ploshilovskaya is a rural locality (a village) in Zaborskoye Rural Settlement, Tarnogsky District, Vologda Oblast, Russia. The population was 47 as of 2002.

Geography 
Ploshilovskaya is located 23 km southwest of Tarnogsky Gorodok (the district's administrative centre) by road. Samsonovskaya is the nearest rural locality.

References 

Rural localities in Tarnogsky District